Autodromo Riccardo Paletti is a race track for motorsports near Varano in the Province of Parma, Italy. The track began as a small  oval in 1969, and this was then expanded to a full , 11 turn race track. This new layout was inaugurated officially on 26 March 1972. The track is named after Formula One driver Riccardo Paletti (1958–1982), who was killed at the 1982 Canadian Grand Prix.

Lap records

The official race lap records at the Autodromo Riccardo Paletti are listed as:

Notes

References

External links 
 Autodromo Riccardo Paletti (Italian only)
 

Motorsport venues in Italy
Sports venues in Italy